Ispartakule railway station is a station in Başakşehir, Turkey, in the eastern suburbs of Istanbul. TCDD Taşımacılık operates two daily regional trains from Istanbul to Kapıkule and Çerkezköy, which stops at Ispartakule. The station consists of a side platform and a narrow island platform servicing three tracks.

The station was opened in 1873 by the Oriental Railway.

References

External links
Station timetable

Railway stations in Istanbul Province
Railway stations opened in 1873
1873 establishments in the Ottoman Empire
Başakşehir